Austin TV is an instrumental post-rock band formed in 2001 in Mexico City. Austin TV creates sonic landscapes with their music without lyrics. They have opened for groups like Yo La Tengo in Mexico and Café Tacuba in the U.S. leg of their 2007 tour, and have released three LPs, one EP and appearances in many Mexican independent bands compilations. Like The Residents or Devo, the group usually develops on stage with masks, disguises and uniforms, reason of their motto "Your face is not important, the truth is inside".

Austin TV has shared the stage with many important bands of the Mexican scene, as well as international bands such as Mogwai, Tristeza, the Album Leaf and Incubus, among others. They have played at very important festivals like Vive Latino, Zero Fest, Motorokr Fest, SXSW, Personal Fest in Argentina, Manifest, Festival Cervantino, LAMC in New York, Coachella Valley Music and Arts Festival, and recently at the Rock al Parque Fest in Colombia, and "Quitofest" in Ecuador. They have also opened at the Aragon Ballroom in Chicago.

Members 
Chiosan (keyboards and samplers)
Fando (guitar)
Rata (bass) – A former member of the Mexican emo-punk band Spandex
Xna Yer (drums – beat box and kaoss pad) – Former member of the Mexican punk rock band Hulespuma and since 2013 member of Dolores De Huevos
Totore (guitar)

Guest Members
Josué "Hobbit mayor" Ortíz (guitar @ Los Perros Predicen Temblores concert)

Former Members
Chato (guitar, left the band after Coachella 2008 and a few more concerts)
Pasa (bass, left the band in 2003)
Isra de Viana - Zaiya (guitar, left the band in 2003)

Indie-O Music Awards
On June 11, 2008, Austin TV received four awards at the Indie-O Music Awards, the first awards created to recognize the best of the independent music scene in Mexico. 
The categories from which they received an award were:
 People's choice
 Best punk & subgenre album
 Best album's art design (Trevore Valenzuela & Marcos Castro's art)
 Best band of the year.

Coachella 2008
During the presentation of Fontana Bella in Mexico City (in late October, 2007), the band's manager, Carlos "Jiju" Ruiz announced that the band was confirmed to be playing at Coachella Valley Music and Arts Festival, an American festival held in Indio, CA. 

Taking advantage of this, they prepared a California U.S. tour with five previous dates to Coachella.

The dates were:
 April 19: Tijuana BC, Mex. @ Multiculti
 April 20: Chulavista CA, USA.
 April 21: Pomona CA, USA @ Glasshouse
 April 23: Oxnard CA, USA.
 April 24: Sn. Jose CA, USA.

Los Perros Predicen Temblores concert
This special show, translated in English "Dogs can predict earthquakes", was held at one of the most important theaters in Mexico City, the Teatro Metropolitan on August 29, 2008. Having a completely "sold out" date since the 1st week of tickets release, the show was theatrically performed by the band using a xoloitzcuintle dog disguise and had actors, real xoloitzcuintle dogs running around the stage, choreography dancers and special guest musicians such as Emmanuel "Meme" del Real, member of Cafe Tacuba, playing the acoustic guitar and keyboards and the violinist "Alegre". Meme also had a special feature in their LP presentation Fontana Bella at the Pabellon de Alta Tecnologia in Mexico City on October 1, 2007.
Josue "Hobbit mayor" Ortiz, from the band Vicente Gayo, played the guitar replacing Chato.

Discography
LP
La última noche del mundo - November 2003
Asrael (B-sides and live tracks) - August 2004
Fontana Bella - May 2007
Caballeros del Albedrio - 2011

EP
Austin TV EP - September 2002

Live DVD
Temblaban con Sonata Solitaria - July 2006

Appearances
 "Aimee Observó el Cielo" Prueba Esto 2 (Compilation) - June 2003
 "Valiente" México Suena en Los Ángeles (Compilation) - February 2004
 "Les Choses Sont Bizarres" Nuevos Tiempos Viejos Amigos (Compilation) - August 2005
 "Dos Tardes de Mi Vida" Todos Somos Rigo (Compilation) - March 2006
 "Aviéntame'" Tributo a Caifanes'' (Compilation) - November 2010

External links

Myspace
Austin TV Old website

Mexican rock music groups
Mexican post-rock groups
Musical groups from Mexico City
Masked musicians